Makivora is a genus of moths belonging to the family Tortricidae.

Species
Makivora hagiyai Oku, 1979

See also
List of Tortricidae genera

References

External links
tortricidae.com

Tortricidae genera
Olethreutinae